Gedai (also Romanized as Gedā’ī; also known as Kadā’ī and Kedā’ī) is a village in Rudhaleh Rural District, Rig District, Ganaveh County, Bushehr Province, Iran. At the 2006 census, its population was 40, in 7 families.

References 

Populated places in Ganaveh County